Matthias Bachinger and Dieter Kindlmann won the final 6–4, 6–2, against Azzaro and Crugnola (who were the defending champions).

Seeds

Draw

Draw

References
 Doubles Draw

Riviera di Rimini Challenger - Doubles
Riviera di Rimini Challenger